Michael Joseph Roads, (born 14 April 1937) is a UK-born resident of Australia and an author of essays, articles and books including Talking with Nature – Journey Into Nature, Journey Into Oneness and Into a Timeless Realm. His more recent books include the award-winning novel Getting There, Through the Eyes of Love, Journeying with Pan (Books One, Two and Three), Insights of a Modern Mystic , Stepping Between Realities , From Illusion to Enlightenment and  Entering the Secret World of Nature.

Biography 
Michael J. Roads was born in Cambridgeshire, England, and grew up as a farmer's son. He left school as early as he could and worked for his father. At the age of 21, he married his first wife, Treenie (née Barker), with whom he emigrated to Australia in 1964. Together, they had a beef and dairy farm and raised four children. During this time, he became one of the key members that initiated the Australian organic movement and he wrote his first book, on organic gardening, which became a bestseller. After selling the farm in the mid-70s, he and his late wife co-founded a spiritual community, which they left after four years, eventually moving to the Belligen Valley on the east coast of Australia. In 2007 he remarried Carolyn (née Silver). Currently they reside on the Sunshine Coast of Queensland.

In 1986 he experienced what he described as "a profound leap into a higher state of consciousness" and began writing his books and giving public talks. For over thirty years, Roads has been a writer and spiritual teacher in many countries around the world.

Teachings 
In his writings he now focusses on denying the scientific consensus on COVID-19.

As well as in his own publications, Roads and his work have appeared in the publications and videos of a number of other writers, including Healthy-Living magazine, Wake-up World magazine, 
Polly Darling, 
GaiamTV's, Lilou Mace
Rick Archer, Buddha at the Gas Pump,

Publications 

 A guide to organic living in Australia, M. Fisher Bookshop, 1977
 Talking with Nature: Sharing the Energies and Spirit of Trees, Plants, Birds, and Earth, H.J. Kramer; 1987
 The natural magic of mulch: organic gardening Australian style, Greenhouse Publications, 1989
 Journey into Nature: A Spiritual Adventure, H.J. Kramer; 1990
 Simple Is Powerful: Anecdotes for a Complex World, H J Kramer, 1991
 Journey into Oneness: A Spiritual Odyssey, H.J. Kramer,1994
 Into a Timeless Realm: A Metaphysical Adventure, H.J. Kramer, 1996
 Getting There, Hampton Roads Publishing Company, 1998
 The Magic Formula, Silverroads Pub, June 2003
 Talking with Nature, Journey into Nature, H.J. Kramer, 16 July 2003
 More Than Money, True Prosperity: A Wholistic Guide to Having It All, Silverroads Pub, 2004
 The Oracle, Roadslight, 2005
 The Boy with No Shadow, Pineal Press, 2010
 Conscious Gardening: Practical and Metaphysical Expert Advice to Grow Your Garden Organically, Quintessence, 2011
 A Glimpse of Something Greater, Six Degrees Publishing Group, 2011
 Sago, the Caterpillar Who Wanted to Fly: The Teachings of Buzz-Buzz, the Enlightened Bumble Bee, CreateSpace Independent Publishing Platform, 2013
 Through the Eyes of Love, Book One,  Six Degrees Publishing Group, 2013
 Through the Eyes of Love, Book Two, Six Degrees Publishing Group, 2013
 Through the Eyes of Love, Book Three, Six Degrees Publishing Group, 2013
 Stepping Between Realities, Six Degrees Publishing Group, 2014
 Insights of a Modern Mystic, Six Degrees Publishing Group, 2015
 From Illusion to Enlightenment, Six Degrees Publishing Group, 2017
 Entering the Secret World of Nature, Six Degrees Publishing Group, 2018

Video 

 Michael Roads Videos, YouTube

DVD 

 Choose Love, Wähle Liebe, Choisir L'Amour, New World View

References

External links 
 Michael J. Roads International website
 WorldCat results for Michael J. Roads

Spiritual teachers
Spiritual writers
Australian writers
Living people
Organic gardeners
1937 births